The Musée historique (Historical museum) de la ville de Strasbourg is a museum in Strasbourg in the Bas-Rhin department of France. It is located in the Renaissance building of the former slaughterhouse (Grande boucherie) and is dedicated to the tumultuous history of the city from the early Middle Ages until the contemporary period.

Bibliography 
 Les collections du Musée historique de la ville de Strasbourg : de la ville libre à la ville révolutionnaire, Strasbourg, Musées de la ville de Strasbourg, 2008,

External links 

Historique
Strasbourg
Local museums in France